The Albuquerque Metropolitan Statistical Area, sometimes referred to as Tiguex (named after the Southern Tiwa), is a metropolitan area in central New Mexico centered on the city of Albuquerque. The metro comprises four counties: Bernalillo, Sandoval, Torrance, and Valencia. As of the 2010 United States Census, the MSA had a population of 887,077. The population is estimated to be 923,630 as of July 1, 2020, making Greater Albuquerque the 61st-largest MSA in the nation. The Albuquerque MSA forms a part of the larger Albuquerque–Santa Fe–Las Vegas combined statistical area with a 2020 estimated population of 1,165,181, ranked  49th-largest in the country.

History
It was the center of the Aztec legend of the Seven Cities of Gold, sometimes called the "cities of Cibola". The Tiguex Province of Santa Fe de Nuevo México was named after the Southern Tiwa speaking Puebloans in the area, they inhabited the area along with the Jemez and Keres people. The area between Bernalillo and Corrales was being farmed for sacramental wine since 1620, which started the New Mexico wine heritage. Following this early wine industry several Spanish towns were founded, including Barelas in 1662 and Bernalillo in 1695. The main city, Albuquerque, was founded on 1706 as La Villa de Alburquerque as the trade center for the region. During the 19th century, Nuevo México and its Tiguex Province were acquired by the United States as a part of the Treaty of Guadalupe Hidalgo. Becoming the New Mexico Territory it became a prominent aspect of the American frontier during the 19th century, being highlighted in Western fiction with Billy the Kid, Elfego Baca, and Geronimo becoming lasting icons in later adaption to film. In the 20th century New Mexico gained statehood, and since then trade in the region grew due to growth in technology, media, and agriculture sectors, driven by the New Mexico Technology Corridor, media in Albuquerque, and New Mexican cuisine.

Counties
Bernalillo
Sandoval
Torrance
Valencia

Communities

Cities
Albuquerque (Principal city)
Belen
Moriarty
Rio Communities
Rio Rancho

Towns

Bernalillo
Estancia
Mountainair
Peralta

Villages
Bosque Farms
Corrales
Cuba
Encino
Jemez Springs
Los Lunas
Los Ranchos de Albuquerque
San Ysidro
Tijeras
Willard

Census-designated places

Algodones
Carnuel
Casa Colorada
Cedar Crest
Chilili
Cochiti
El Cerro-Monterey Park
Isleta Village Proper
Jarales
Jemez Pueblo
La Jara
Los Chavez
Los Trujillos-Gabaldon
Manzano
Meadow Lake
North Valley
Paradise Hills
Pena Blanca
Placitas
Ponderosa
Pueblo of Sandia Village
Regina
Rio Communities North
Rio Communities
San Felipe Pueblo
Santa Ana Pueblo
Santo Domingo Pueblo
South Valley
Tajique
Tome-Adelino
Torreon (Sandoval County)
Torreon (Torrance County)
Valencia
Zia Pueblo

Partial inclusions and future developments 
Neighboring Laguna Pueblo borders the metropolitan area, and part of its boundaries are included the metropolitan population. Most notably the area surrounding Route 66 Resort and Casino.

Mesa del Sol in Albuquerque and Santolina on the West Mesa in rural Bernalillo County are planned for 100,000 inhabitants each and are New Mexico's largest such planned developments.

Demographics

As of the 2010 United States Census, there were 887,077 people, 347,366 households, and 222,811 families residing within the MSA. The racial makeup of the MSA was 49.63% White, 2.68% African American, 5.86% Native American, 2.02% Asian, 0.10% Pacific Islander, 15.40% from one other race, and 4.32% from two or more races. Hispanic or Latino of any race were 46.70% of the population.

The median income for a household in the MSA was $47,383 and the median income for a family was $59,158. Males had a median income of $31,486 versus $20,497 for females. The per capita income for the MSA was $25,044.

According to 2014-2018 census data, 89.7% of the population was a high school graduate or higher, and 34.7% had a bachelor's degree or higher.

Labor force
Albuquerque MSA Estimated Employment (August 2006)

See also
List of metropolitan areas in New Mexico
List of micropolitan areas in New Mexico
List of cities in New Mexico

References

 
+Met
Metropolitan areas of New Mexico
Geography of Bernalillo County, New Mexico
Geography of Sandoval County, New Mexico
Geography of Torrance County, New Mexico
Geography of Valencia County, New Mexico